The 1924 Hobart Carnival was the fifth Australian National Football Carnival, an Australian football interstate competition. It was held from 6–15 August and was the first carnival to be hosted by the Tasmanian city of Hobart. It was won by Victoria.

After only three states had contested the 1921 Perth Carnival due to high travelling expenses, the 1924 Carnival was contested by all six states. The carnival was staged as a full round-robin amongst the states. All fifteen matches were played at North Hobart Oval.

Since the weaker footballing states of Queensland and New South Wales were grouped together with the likes of Victoria, there were many one sided games. Queensland in particular was uncompetitive against the main states. Western Australia managed to kick a senior record 43 goals in one match against the Queenslanders, 23 of which were kicked by full-forward Bonny Campbell – also a senior record. Victoria's game against Queensland was described in the Tasmanian press as "one of the most farcial football matches ever witnessed in Hobart", with Victoria applying little defensive pressure (resulting in Queensland's highest score of the tournament), and making positional changes which resulted in all eighteen Victorian players scoring at least one goal.

The best regarded match of the tournament, and ultimately the Championship-deciding match, was played on the first Saturday of the carnival between Victoria and Western Australia. Campbell (Western Australia) and Lloyd Hagger (Victoria) both scored seven goals. The Victorians won the encounter by eight points.

The carnival was the biggest sporting event to have been held in Tasmania's history at that time. Huge crowds were drawn to the marquee days of the carnival, attracting visitors from all over Tasmania. The crowd of 15,687 which attended the first Saturday set a new record as the highest sporting crowd in the history of Tasmania, and the second Saturday drew more than 12,000. A gazetted half-holiday was observed on the opening Wednesday, and businesses also closed on the second Wednesday, resulting in crowds of around 10,000 on both days. Overall, the carnival drew 60,706 paying spectators across nine days, and took a carnival record £5823/1/– at the gate. The average tournament crowd was reduced by the Tuesday and Thursday matches played during the second week – which featured predictably one-sided affairs, did not feature Tasmania, and one of which was played in heavy rain – which each drew only a couple of hundred of spectators.

As occurred at many carnivals, overuse of the ground and untimely heavy rain resulted in the condition of the playing surface degenerating to a bog by the end of the carnival.

Results

Ladder

Goalkickers

Squads

Victoria

Footnotes

References 
 
 

Australian rules interstate football
Hobart Carnival, 1924
August 1924 sports events